Arnav Sinha (born 30 November 1995) is an Indian cricketer. He made his first-class debut on 9 December 2019, for Jharkhand in the 2019–20 Ranji Trophy.

References

External links
 

1995 births
Living people
Indian cricketers
Jharkhand cricketers
Place of birth missing (living people)